This is a list of seasons completed by the Valparaiso Beacons men's college basketball team.

Seasons

References

 
Valparaiso Crusaders
Valparaiso Beacons basketball seasons